The 2018 African Artistic Gymnastics Championships was the 14th iteration of the event and took place on May 9–12 in Swakopmund, Namibia.

Medal winners

Senior

Junior

Medal table

Combined

Men

Women

Youth Olympic berths 
The event served as qualification for the 2018 Youth Olympic Games.  For women's artistic gymnastics South Africa, Egypt, and Algeria qualified berths.  For men's artistic gymnastics Egypt and South Africa qualified berths.

References

Africa
International sports competitions hosted by Namibia
African Artistic Gymnastics Championships
African Artistic Gymnastics Championships